Corella is a genus of sea squirts belonging to the family Corellidae. The genome of Corella inflata has been sequenced which has provided insight into tunicate evolution

Genera
The World Register of Marine Species includes the following species in this genus:

Corella aequabilis Sluiter, 1904
Corella antarctica Sluiter, 1905
Corella borealis Traustedt, 1886
Corella brewinae Monniot F., 2013
Corella eumyota Traustedt, 1882
Corella halli Kott, 1951
Corella inflata Huntsman, 1912
Corella japonica Herdman, 1880
Corella minuta Traustedt, 1882
Corella parallelogramma (Müller, 1776)
Corella willmeriana Herdman, 1898

References

External links

Enterogona
Tunicate genera